Bread of Stone are an American contemporary Christian music and pop rock band from Sioux City, Iowa, and they were formed in 2004. Their members are lead vocalist, Ben Kristijanto, guitarist, Bill Kristijanto, bass guitarist, Tim Barnes, and drummer, Jason Ferris. They released, The Real Life, with DREAM Records, and this album was reviewed by many Christian music publications.

Background
The contemporary Christian music pop rock band formed in Sioux City, Iowa, in 2004. They count as their members; lead vocalist, Ben Kristijanto, guitarist, Bill Kristijanto, bass guitarist, Tim Barnes, and drummer, Jason Ferris. Their former drummer was Wesley Holt.

Music history
The group was formed in 2004, yet their first major label released studio album wasn't released until 2013, The Real Life, by DREAM Records on September 24, 2013.

Members
Current members
 Ben Kristijanto – lead vocals
 Bill Kristijanto – guitar
 Tim Barnes – Bass
 Jason Ferris – drums 
Former members
 Wesley Holt – drums
 Jimmy Klemish - Bass

Discography
Studio albums
 Broken Vessels (May 5, 2004, Independent)
 Letting Go (April 20, 2007, Independent)
 The Real Life (October 29, 2012, Independent; September 24, 2013, DREAM)
 Not Alone (February 24, 2015, BNY)
 Hold The Light (July 1, 2016, BNY)
 Details EP (March 22, 2019, BNY)
EPs
 Saturate EP (July 27, 2010, Independent)

References

External links
 Official website

Musical groups established in 2004
Musical groups from Iowa
American pop rock music groups
American Christian musical groups